Jackson Creek is a tributary of the Susquehanna River in Wyoming County, Pennsylvania, in the United States. Mountains in the creek's vicinity include Avery Mountain and Osterhout Mountain. The surficial geology in the vicinity of these mountains includes Wisconsinan Till and bedrock, among other things. Jackson Creek is classified as a Coldwater Fishery and a Migratory Fishery.

Course
Jackson Creek begins in a broad valley between Avery Mountain and Osterhout Mountain in Tunkhannock Township. It flows south-southwest for a few tenths of a mile before turning south-southeast. After several tenths of a mile, the creek turns east-southeast and passes through a wetland and an unnamed pond or small lake before turning south, crossing Pennsylvania Route 92, and reaching its confluence with the Susquehanna River between two river bends in the river.

Tributaries
The National Map does not show any tributaries to Jackson Creek, named or unnamed.

Geography and geology

The surficial geology in the vicinity of these mountains mainly consists of Wisconsinan Till (a glacial till) and bedrock consisting of sandstone and shale. Alluvium (containing stratified sand, silt, and gravel), Wisconsinan Outwash, alluvial terrace, wetlands, fill, and lakes also occur in the area.

Watershed and biology
Jackson Creek is entirely within the United States Geological Survey quadrangle of Tunkhannock.

A company known as Williams Field Services, LLC. has been issued an erosion and sediment control permit for which one of the receiving streams is Jackson Creek. The creek flows alongside Lane Hill Road for a significant portion of its length.

Jackson Creek is classified as a Coldwater Fishery and a Migratory Fishery.

History
Jackson Creek was entered into the Geographic Names Information System on January 1, 1990 because it appears in Israel C. White's 1883 book The geology of the North Branch Susquehanna River Region in the six counties of Wyoming, Lackawanna, Luzerne, Columbia, Montour and Northumberland. Its identifier in the Geographic Names Information System is 1202093.

See also
Mill Run (Susquehanna River), next tributary of the Susquehanna River going downriver
Bowman Creek, next tributary of the Susquehanna River going upriver
List of rivers of Pennsylvania

References

External links
Google Street View image of Jackson Creek from Pennsylvania Route 92

Rivers of Wyoming County, Pennsylvania
Tributaries of the Susquehanna River
Rivers of Pennsylvania